The phonology of Turkish deals with current phonology and phonetics, particularly of Istanbul Turkish. A notable feature of the phonology of Turkish is a system of vowel harmony that causes vowels in most words to be either front or back and either rounded or unrounded. Velar stop consonants have palatal allophones before front vowels.

Consonants

Similarly, the consonant  is realized as a clear or light  next to front vowels (including word finally), and as a velarized  next to the central and back vowels . This pronunciation can be indicated by adding a circumflex accent over the vowel: e.g. ('infidel'),  ('condemned'),  ('necessary'), although the use of this diacritic has become increasingly archaic.
 In addition, there is a debatable phoneme, called  ('soft g') and written , which only occurs after a vowel. Between back vowels, it may be silent or sound like a bilabial glide. When not between vowels (that is, word finally and before a consonant), it is generally realized as vowel length, lengthening the preceding vowel, or as a slight  if preceded by a front vowel.
 Word-finally and preconsonantally, it lengthens the preceding vowel.
 Between front vowels it is an approximant, either front-velar  or palatal .
 Otherwise, intervocalic  is phonetically zero (deleted).  Before the loss of this sound, Turkish did not allow vowel sequences in native words, and today the letter  serves largely to indicate vowel length and vowel sequences where  once occurred.
 The phoneme  only occurs in loanwords.
 is an allophone of  before back vowels   in many dialects in eastern and southeastern Turkey, including Hatay dialect.

Phonetic notes:

  are bilabial, whereas  vary between bilabial and labiodental.
 Some speakers realize  as bilabial  when it occurs before the rounded vowels  as well as (although to a lesser extent) word-finally after those rounded vowels. In other environments, it is labiodental .
Between two vowels (with at least one of them, usually the following one, being rounded), it is realized as a voiced bilabial approximant , whereas before or after a rounded vowel (but not between vowels), it is realized as a voiced bilabial fricative . Some speakers have only one bilabial allophone.
  are dental ,  is velarized dental ,  is alveolar , whereas  is palatalized post-alveolar .
  is frequently devoiced word-finally and before a voiceless consonant. According to one source, it is only realized as a modal tap intervocalically.
 Syllable-initial  are usually aspirated.
  are affricates, not plosives. They have nevertheless been placed in the table in that manner (patterning with plosives) in order to both save space and reflect the phonology better.
 Final  may be fronted to a voiceless velar fricative . It may be fronted even further after front vowels, then tending towards a voiceless palatal fricative .
  are devoiced to  word- and morpheme-finally, as well as before a consonant:  ('to do, to make') is pronounced . (This is reflected in the orthography, so that it is spelled ).

Consonant assimilation
Because of assimilation, an initial voiced consonant of a suffix is devoiced when the word it is attached to ends in a voiceless consonant. For example,

Phonotactics 

Turkish phonotactics is almost completely regular. The maximal syllable structure is (C)V(C)(C). Although Turkish words can take multiple final consonants, the possibilities are limited. Multi-syllable words are syllabified to have C.CV or V.CV syllable splits, C.V split is disallowed, V.V split is only found in rare specific occurrences.

Even in these words, the complex onsets are only pronounced as such in very careful speech. Otherwise, speakers often epenthesize a vowel after the first consonant. This differs from orthographic conventions of the early 20th century that did reflect this epenthesis.

 All syllables have a nucleus
 No diphthongs in the standard dialect ( is always treated as a consonant)
 No long vowel followed by syllable-final voiced consonant (this essentially forbids trimoraic syllables)
 No complex onsets (except for the exceptions above) 
 In a complex coda:
 The first consonant is either a voiceless fricative,  or 
 The second consonant is either a voiceless plosive, or 
 No word-initial geminates - in all other syllables, geminates are allowed only in the onset (hyphenation and syllabification in Turkish match except for this point; hyphenation splits the geminates)

Rural dialects regularize many of the exceptions described above.

Vowels

The vowels of the Turkish language are, in their alphabetical order, . There are no phonemic diphthongs in Turkish and when two vowels are adjacent in the spelling of a word, which only occurs in some loanwords, each vowel retains its individual sound (e.g. aile , laik ). In some other words, the diphthong becomes a two-syllable form with a semivocalic  in between.

  has been variously described as close back , near-close near-back  and close central  with a near-close allophone that occurs in the final open syllable of a phrase.
  are phonetically mid . For simplicity, this article omits the relative diacritic even in phonetic transcription.
Sound merger started in the 11th century and finished in early Ottoman era. Most speakers lower  to ~ before coda , so that  'somersault' is pronounced .
  has been variously described as central  and back , because of the vowel harmony. For simplicity, this article uses the diacriticless symbol , even in phonetic transcription.  is phonologically a back vowel, because it patterns with other back vowels in harmonic processes and the alternation of adjacent consonants (see above).

Vowel harmony

Native Turkish grammar books call the backness harmony major vowel harmony, and the combined backness and lip harmony minor vowel harmony.

The Turkish vowel system can be considered as being three-dimensional, where vowels are characterised by three features: front/back, rounded/unrounded, and high/low, resulting in eight possible combinations, each corresponding to one Turkish vowel, as shown in the table. 

Vowel harmony of grammatical suffixes is realized through "a chameleon-like quality", meaning that the vowels of suffixes change to harmonize with the vowel of the preceding syllable. According to the changeable vowel, there are two patterns:
 twofold: Backness is preserved, that is,  appears following a front vowel and  appears following a back vowel. For example, the locative suffix is -de after front vowels and -da after back vowels.  The notation -de2 is shorthand for this pattern.
 fourfold: Both backness and rounding are preserved. For example, the genitive suffix is -in after unrounded front vowels, -ün after rounded front vowels, -ın after unrounded back vowels, and -un after rounded back vowels. The notation -in4 can be this pattern's shorthand.

The vowel  does not occur in grammatical suffixes.

Some examples illustrating the use of vowel harmony in Turkish with the copula -dir4 ('[he/she/it] is'):
  ('it is Turkey') – with an apostrophe because  is a proper noun.
  ('it is the day')
  ('it is the door')
  ('it is the coat').

In the suffix -e2bil ('may' or 'can'), only the first vowel undergoes vowel harmony.

Also suffixes added to foreign borrowings and proper nouns usually harmonize their vowel with the syllable immediately preceding the suffix:  ('in Amsterdam'),  ('in Paris').

Consonantal effects
In most words, consonants are neutral or transparent and have no effect on vowel harmony. In borrowed vocabulary, however, back vowel harmony can be interrupted by the presence of a "front" (i.e. coronal or labial) consonant, and in rarer cases, front vowel harmony can be reversed by the presence of a "back" consonant.

For example, Arabic and French loanwords containing back vowels may nevertheless end in a clear  instead of a velarized . Harmonizing suffixes added to such words contain front vowels. The table above gives some examples.

Arabic loanwords ending in  usually take front-vowel suffixes if the origin is kāf, but back-vowel suffixes if the origin is qāf: e.g.  ('perception' acc. from  idrāk) vs.  ('top' acc. from ←  fawq). Loanwords ending in  derived from Arabic tāʼ marbūṭah take front-vowel suffixes: e.g.  ('hour' dat. from  sāʿat),  ('trip' dat. from  siyāḥat). Words ending in  derived from the Arabic feminine plural ending -āt or from devoicing of Arabic dāl take the expected back-vowel suffixes: e.g.  ('literature' acc. from  adabiyyāt),  ('purpose', nom. and acc. from مقصد maqṣad).

Front-vowel suffixes are also used with many Arabic monosyllables containing  followed by two consonants, the second of which is a front consonant: e.g. ('letter' acc.),  ('war', nom. and acc.). Some combinations of consonants give rise to vowel insertion, and in these cases the epenthetic vowel may also be front vowel: e.g.

There is a tendency to eliminate these exceptional consonantal effects and to apply vowel harmony more regularly, especially for frequent words and those whose foreign origin is not apparent.

Word-accent
Turkish words are said to have an accent on one syllable of the word. In most words the accent comes on the last syllable of the word, but there are some words, such as place names, foreign borrowings, words containing certain suffixes, and certain adverbs, where the accent comes earlier in the word.

A phonetic study by  shows that when a word has non-final accent, e.g. ('not to dip'), the accented syllable is higher in pitch than the following ones; it may also have slightly greater intensity (i.e. be louder) than an unaccented syllable in the same position.

The final syllable is also often more intense (louder) than the preceding one. Some scholars consider such words to be unaccented.

Stress or pitch?
Although most treatments of Turkish refer to the word-accent as "stress", some scholars consider it a kind of pitch accent.  writes that stress in Turkish "is actually pitch accent rather than dynamic stress." An acoustic study, agrees with this assessment, concluding that though duration and intensity of the accented syllable are significant, the most reliable cue to accent-location is the pitch of the vowel. In its word-accent, therefore, Turkish "bears a great similarity with other pitch-accent languages such as Japanese, Basque, and Serbo-Croatian". Similarly, noting the difference in phonetic realisation between final and non-final accent, proposes that "Final accent in Turkish is not 'stress', but is formally a boundary tone." According to this analysis therefore, only words with non-final accent are accented, and all other words are accentless.

However, not all researchers agree with this conclusion.  writes: "Finally stressed words do not behave like accentless words and there is no unequivocal evidence that the language has a pitch-accent system."

Pronunciation of the accent
A non-final accent is generally pronounced with a relatively high pitch followed by a fall in pitch on the following syllable. The syllables preceding the accent may either be slightly lower than the accented syllable or on a plateau with it. In words like  ('with a word'), where the first and third syllable are louder than the second, it is nonetheless the second syllable which is considered to have the accent, because it is higher in pitch, and followed by a fall in pitch.

However, the accent can disappear in certain circumstances; for example, when the word is the second part of a compound, e.g. In this case only the first word is accented.

If the accented vowel is final, it is often slightly higher in pitch than the preceding syllable; but in some contexts or with some speakers there is no rise in pitch.

Intonational tones
In addition to the accent on words, intonational tones can also be heard in Turkish. One of these is a rising boundary tone, which is a sharp rise in pitch frequently heard at the end of a phrase, especially on the last syllable of the topic of a sentence. The phrase ↑ ('after that,...'), for example, is often pronounced with a rising boundary tone on the last syllable (indicated here by an arrow).

Another intonational tone, heard in yes-no questions, is a high tone or intonational pitch-accent on the syllable before the particle , e.g.  ('Are these apples fresh?'). This tone tends to be much higher in pitch than the normal word-accent.

A raised pitch is also used in Turkish to indicate focus (the word containing the important information being conveyed to the listener). "Intonation ... may override lexical pitch in Turkish".

Final accent
As stated above, word-final accent is the usual pattern in Turkish:
  ('apple')
  ('houses')

When a non-preaccenting suffix is added, the accent moves to the suffix:
  ('apples')
  ('from the houses')
  ('my houses')

Non-final accent in Turkish words
Non-final accent in Turkish words is generally caused by the addition of certain suffixes to the word. Some of these (always of two syllables, such as -) are accented themselves; others put an accent on the syllable which precedes them.

Accented suffixes
These include the following:
  (continuous):  ('he is coming'),  ('they were coming')
  ('by'):  ('by coming')
  ('when'):  ('when he comes')
  ('suddenly', 'quickly'):  ('he will quickly go')

Note that since a focus word frequently precedes a verb (see below), causing any following accent to be neutralised, these accents on verbs can often not be heard.

Pre-accenting suffixes
Among the pre-accenting suffixes are:
  (negative), e.g.  ('don't be afraid!'),  ('I did not come').
The pre-accenting is also seen in combination with :  ('he/she/it does not come').
However, in the aorist tense the negative is stressed:  ('it will never extinguish').
  ('with'):  ('with anger, angrily')
  ('-ish'):  ('Turkish')
  ('that which belongs to'):  ('my one')

The following, though written separately, are pronounced as if pre-accenting suffixes, and the stress on the final syllable of the preceding word is more pronounced than usual:
  ('also', 'even'):  ('even apples')
  (interrogative):  ('apples?')

(in the evening),  (without coming).

Copular suffixes
Suffixes meaning 'is' or 'was' added to nouns, adjectives or participles, and which act like a copula, are pre-accenting:
  ('he/she/it was ill')
  ('they are children')
  ('it's Mustafa')
  ('if I am a student')

Copular suffixes are also pre-accenting when added to the following participles: future, aorist, and obligation:
  ('they would go')
  ('you used to hide yourself')
  ('I find')
  ('you go')
  ('they ought to go')
Often at the end of a sentence the verb is unaccented, with all the syllables on the same pitch.
  ('he/she/it went')
  ('if he goes')

This accentual pattern can disambiguate homographic words containing possessive suffixes or the plural suffix:
  ('it's me'), vs.  ('my')
  ('they are children'), vs.  ('children')

Compounds
Compound nouns are usually accented on the first element only. Any accent on the second element is lost:
  ('prime minister')
  ('capital city')

The same is true of compound and intensive adjectives:
  ('milk white')
  ('very blue')

Some compounds, however, are accented on the final, for example those of the form verb-verb or subject-verb:
  ('sleep-walker')
  ('lamb served on aubergine purée', lit. 'the sultan liked it')

Remaining compounds have Sezer-type accent on whole word.
Compound numerals are accented like one word or separately depending on speaker.

Other words with non-final accent
Certain adverbs take initial accent:
  ('where?'),  ('where to?'),  ('how?'),  ('which?')
  ('tomorrow'),  ('afterwards'),  ('now'),  ('again')

Certain adverbs ending in  have penultimate accent unless they end in a cretic (– u x) rhythm, thus following the Sezer rule (see below):
  ('economically')
  ('by surety')

Some kinship terms are irregularly accented on the first syllable:
  ('mother'),  ('maternal aunt'),  ('paternal aunt'),  ('maternal uncle'),  ('paternal uncle'),  ('brother/sister'),  ('in-law')

Two accents in the same word
When two pre-accenting suffixes are added to a word with a non-final accent, only the first accent is pronounced:
  ('Turkish also')
  ('he was in Ankara')

However, the accent preceding the negative  may take precedence over an earlier accent:
  ('needing to become Europeanised')
  ('needing not to become Europeanised')

In the following pair also, the accent shifts from the object to the position before the negative:
  ('Ali played cards')
  ('Ali didn't play cards')

However, even the negative suffix accent may disappear if the focus is elsewhere. Thus in sentences of the kind "not A but B", the element B is focussed, while A loses its accent.  gives a pitch track of the following sentence, in which the only tone on the first word is a rising boundary tone on the last syllable :
  ('They weren't getting tired, they were having fun').

In the second word, the highest pitch is on the syllable  and the accent on the suffix  almost entirely disappears.

Place names
Place names usually follow a different accentual pattern, known in the linguistics literature as "Sezer stress" (after the discoverer of the pattern, Engin Sezer). According to this rule, place names that have a heavy syllable (CVC) in the antepenultimate position, followed by a light syllable (CV) in penultimate position (that is, those ending with a cretic ¯ ˘ ¯ or dactylic ¯ ˘ ˘ rhythm), have a fixed antepenultimate stress:

Most other place names have a fixed penultimate stress:
 
 
 

Some exceptions to the Sezer stress rule have been noted:

(a) Many foreign place names, as well as some Turkish names of foreign origin, have fixed penultimate stress, even when they have cretic rhythm:
  ('England'),  ('Mexico'),  ('Belgium'),  ('Europe')
  ('Scutari'),  ('Pergamon')

But  ('Moscow') has Sezer stress.

(b) Names ending in  have antepenultimate stress:
 , 

  ('India'),  ('Bulgaria'),  ('Mongolia'),  ('Greece')
 , 
 
  (but also ), 

(d) Names formed from common words which already have a fixed accent retain the accent in the same place:
  (from  'milky')

(e) Compounds (other than those listed above) are generally accented on the first element:
 , {{lang|tr|[[Kastamonu|Kastamonu}}
 
  ('Kandilli street'),  ('the Black Sea')

(f) Other exceptions:
 

As with all other words, names which are accented on the penultimate or antepenultimate retain the stress in the same place even when pre-accenting suffixes are added, while those accented on the final syllable behave like other final-accented words:.
  >  ('from Ankara') >  ('from Ankara?')
  >  ('from Işıklar') >  ('from Işıklar?')

Personal names
Turkish personal names, unlike place names, have final accent:
 .

When the speaker is calling someone by their name, the accent may sometimes move up:
  ('Ahmet, come here!').

Ordinary words also have a different accent in the vocative:
  ('My teacher...!'),  ('Sir!')

Some surnames have non-final stress:

Others have regular stress:
 , 

Foreign surnames tend to be accented on the penultimate syllable, regardless of the accent in the original language:
  ('Oedipus')
  ('Eisenhower'),  ('Ptolemy'),  ('Mendelssohn')
 

Foreign words
The majority of foreign words in Turkish, especially most of those from Arabic, have normal final stress:
  ('book'),  ('world'),  ('comfortable')

The same is true of some more recent borrowings from western languages:
  ('photocopy'),  ('steamboat')

On the other hand, many other foreign words follow the Sezer rules. So words with a dactylic or cretic ending ( ¯ ˘ * ) often have antepenultimate accent:
  ('window'),  ('scenery'),  ('Chevrolet'),  ('bedframe')

Those with other patterns accordingly have penultimate accent:
  ('restaurant'),  ('workshop'),  ('medal'),  ('table'),  ('bag')
  ('couch'),  ('cinema'),  ('lever'),  ('chocolate')
  ('screwdriver'),  ('college faculty'),  ('jubilee'),  ('newspaper').

Some have irregular stress, though still either penultimate or antepenultimate:
  ('negative'),  ('one wonders')
  ('factory')

The accent on these last is not fixed, but moves to the end when non-preaccenting suffixes are added, e.g.  ('steamboats'). However, words with non-final accent keep the accent in the same place, e.g.  ('tables').

Phrase-accent
The accent in phrases where one noun qualifies another is exactly the same as that of compound nouns. That is, the first noun usually retains its accent, and the second one loses it:
  ('shepherd salad') (from )
  ('Lithuania(n) restaurant') (from )
 Galata köprüsü ('the Galata bridge')

The same is true when an adjective or numeral qualifies a noun:
  ('the red bag') (from )
  ('a hundred years')

The same is also true of prepositional phrases:
  ('towards the door')
  ('after that')
  ('as on every occasion')

An indefinite object or focussed definite object followed by a positive verb is also accented exactly like a compound, with an accent on the object only, not the verb:
  ('they telephoned')

Focus accent
Focus also plays a part in the accentuation of subject and verb. Thus in the first sentence below, the focus (the important information which the speaker wishes to communicate) is on "a man", and only the first word has an accent while the verb is accentless; in the second sentence the focus is on "came", which has the stronger accent:
  ('a man came')
  ('the man came')

When there are several elements in a Turkish sentence, the focussed word is often placed before the verb and has the strongest accent:.
 . ('My father came from Ankara yesterday')
 . ('My father came from Ankara yesterday')

  ('Who will solve this question?')

See also
 Turkish alphabet
 Turkish grammar

Notes

References

Bibliography

 

 
 
 
 
 
 

 
 
 
 
 
 

 

 
 

Further reading
 Inkelas, Sharon. (1994). Exceptional stress-attracting suffixes in Turkish: Representations vs. the grammar.
 Kaisse, Ellen. (1985). Some theoretical consequences of stress rules in Turkish. In W. Eilfort, P. Kroeber et al. (Eds.), Papers from the general session of the Twenty-first regional meeting (pp. 199–209). Chicago: Chicago Linguistics Society.
 Lees, Robert. (1961). The phonology of Modern Standard Turkish. Indiana University publications: Uralic and Altaic series (Vol. 6). Indiana University Publications.
 Lightner, Theodore. (1978). The main stress rule in Turkish. In M. A. Jazayery, E. Polomé et al. (Eds.), Linguistic and literary studies in honor of Archibald Hill (Vol. 2, pp. 267–270). The Hague: Mouton.
 Swift, Lloyd B. (1963). A reference grammar of Modern Turkish''. Indiana University publications: Uralic and Altaic series (Vol. 19). Bloomington: Indiana University Publications.

External links
 Forvo pronouncing dictionary of Turkish words.

Turkish language
Turkic phonologies